Topki is the name of several inhabited localities in Russia.

Urban localities
Topki (town), Kemerovo Oblast, a town in Kemerovo Oblast; 

Rural localities
Topki (rural locality), Kemerovo Oblast, a selo in Topkinskaya Rural Territory of Topkinsky District in Kemerovo Oblast; 
Topki, Lipetsk Oblast, a selo in Topovsky Selsoviet of Lev-Tolstovsky District in Lipetsk Oblast
Topki, Oryol Oblast, a selo in Topkovsky Selsoviet of Pokrovsky District in Oryol Oblast
Topki, Tula Oblast, a settlement in Velminskaya Rural Administration of Uzlovsky District in Tula Oblast